Hornby Virtual Railway is a video game and model planning environment released for Microsoft Windows in 1996.

Gameplay
Players build a virtual model railway layout in realistic scenes, helping people to plan their real-life layout(s). Fixed track parts, rolling stock, scenery, building, tree and hills similar to a real life model railway. Users can also control the trains once the virtual railway is built and planned, leading to some people to call HVR a train simulator. Some advanced parts such as turntables are absent from the game, and all engines on the same track will all move at once, the same speed and direction, much like a real life DC model railway. Engines included in the first edition include the LNER Class A1/A3, the LNER Class A4, Smokey Joe and the Eurostar.

Hornby Virtual Railway   (1996)
Hornby released the First Simulation/Game of the HVR series which was released on 7 June 1996.

Hornby Virtual Railway 2 (2000)
Hornby released Virtual Railway 2 (HVR2), 4 years after the original. The sequel was somewhat more realistic looking than its predecessor, and contained more elements to use such as scenery, new rolling stock, and new engines (includes Virgin 125). Also Download Stations, Locomotives, Rolling stock from www.hornby.com.
Hornby Virtual Railway 2 was released on 2 June 2000.

References

External links
Hornby Website
Hornby Virtual Railway
Hornby Virtual Railway 2

1996 video games
Train simulation video games
Video games developed in the United Kingdom
Windows games
Windows-only games
Hornby Railways